Bigyromonadea is a recently described non-photosynthetic lineage of Heterokonts that at present contains only one species.

Taxonomy
 Class Bigyromonadea Cavalier-Smith 1998 [Developea Karpov & Aleoshin 2016 ex Cavalier-Smith 2017]
 Order Developayellales Doweld 2001 [Developayellida Cavalier-Smith 1987]
 Family Developayellaceae Cavalier-Smith 1997 [Developayellidae]
 Genus Developayella Tong 1995
 Species Developayella elegans Tong 1995
 Genus Develorapax Karpov & Aleoshin 2016
 Species Develorapax marinus Karpov & Aleoshin 2016

References

External links

Heterokont classes
Heterokonts